Muhammad Irfan (born 5 June 1984) is a Pakistani footballer who plays for PIA FC. He is also a member of the Pakistan national football team.

Irfan is a defender who can also play as a midfielder and earned his second international cap against in a 2010 FIFA World Cup qualifying match against Iraq on 28 October 2007 in which the team drew 0-0 with the then Asian Champions.

References

External links

1984 births
Living people
Pakistani footballers
Pakistan international footballers
Footballers at the 2006 Asian Games
Association football defenders
Asian Games competitors for Pakistan
Association football midfielders